Figure skating at the 2020 Winter Youth Olympics took place at the Centre intercommunal de glace de Malley in Lausanne, Switzerland from 10 to 15 January 2020.

Unique to the Youth Olympic Games is a mixed NOC team trophy competition.

Medal summary

Events

Medal table

Records

The following new ISU best scores were set during this competition:

Eligibility
Skaters are eligible to participate at the 2020 Winter Youth Olympics if they were born between 1 January 2003 and 31 December 2005, except males in pairs and ice dance, who may be born between 1 January 2001 and 31 December 2004.

Qualification system
The overall quota for the figure skating competition is 76 total skaters, consisting of 38 men and 38 ladies. There will be 16 skaters in each of the single skating disciplines (men's and ladies'), 10 pair skating teams, and 12 ice dancing teams. The maximum number of entries that qualified by a National Olympic Committee (NOC) is 2 per event, making 12 (6 men, 6 ladies) the maximum number of entries that a country can qualify.

If a country placed a skater in the first, second or third position in a 2019 World Junior Figure Skating Championships discipline they qualify for two spots in that discipline at the Youth Olympics. All other nations can enter one athlete until a quota spot of twelve for each singles event, seven for pairs and nine for ice dancing, are reached. There are further four spots for each single event and three spots for pairs/ice dancing at the 2019–20 ISU Junior Grand Prix. Only one quota place per discipline and NOC can be earned through the 2019–20 ISU Junior Grand Prix series, and only if a NOC doesn't already have a quota place for that discipline.

Number of entries per discipline 
Based on the results of the 2019 World Junior Championships and the 2019–20 ISU Junior Grand Prix the following countries have earned YOG quota places.

Notes  
1. As the host, Switzerland has the right to one entry per discipline.

Summary

Time schedule 
Figure skating events took place on 10–15 January 2020. Listed in local time (UTC+1).

Entries
Countries began announcing their selections in November 2019. The International Skating Union published a complete list of entries on January 6, 2020.

Changes to preliminary assignments

Results

Men

Ladies

Pairs

 Sofiia Nesterova / Artem Darenskyi were disqualified.

Ice dance

Mixed NOC team trophy

Teams

Results

Detailed results

Men

Ladies

Pairs

Ice dancing

References

External links

Results Book – Figure Skating

 
2020 in figure skating
International figure skating competitions hosted by Switzerland
2020
2020 Winter Youth Olympics events